Vasilios Kostikas (born 4 September 1999) is a Greek professional footballer who plays as a winger for Super League 2 club Apollon Pontus.

References

1999 births
Living people
Greek footballers
Super League Greece players
Gamma Ethniki players
Super League Greece 2 players
PAS Lamia 1964 players
Kallithea F.C. players
Apollon Pontou FC players
Association football wingers
Footballers from Central Greece